The Magnet was a British story paper.

The Magnet may also refer to:
The Magnet (novel), a 1931 novel by Maxim Gorki 
The Magnet (film), a 1950 Ealing Studios comedy film
The Magnet (Nedor), a minor fictional hero from the Golden Age of Comics
Comme un aimant, a 2000 French film also known as The Magnet

See also
Magnet (disambiguation)